Doug Okuniewicz is an American politician and businessman currently serving as a member of the Idaho Senate from the 3rd legislative district.  Okuniewicz is Chairman of the Senate Transportation committee and also sits on the Senate Resources and Environment committee.

Early life and education 
Okuniewicz was born in Phoenix, Arizona. He earned a Bachelor of Arts degree from the University of Nevada, Reno, and a Master of Arts in communications from the University of Alabama.

Career 
Okuniewicz has worked for several corporations in the intellectual property, employee benefits, and non-profit sectors. He also holds more than 25 patents. He was originally elected to the Idaho House of Representatives in November 2020 and assumed office on December 1, 2020, succeeding Tim Remington.  Okuniewicz was elected to the Idaho Senate in November 2022 and assumed office on December 1, 2022, succeeding Steve Vick, who did not run.

References 

Living people
People from Phoenix, Arizona
University of Nevada, Reno alumni
University of Alabama alumni
Republican Party members of the Idaho House of Representatives
People from Hayden, Idaho
Year of birth missing (living people)